Kharma is a live album by organist Charles Earland which was recorded at the Montreux Jazz Festival in 1974 and released on the Prestige label.

Reception

Allmusic awarded the album 3 stars stating "Earland was getting into mixing up his customary organ with electric piano and synthesizer by the time of this 1974 concert, recorded at the Montreux Jazz Festival... this is a respectable and energetic set containing some real flights of inspiration, as when he seems to be barely keeping some demons in check during the more frenzied solos".

Track listing 
All compositions by Charles Earland
 "Joe Brown" - 8:38   
 "Morgan" - 13:05   
 "Suite For Martin Luther King Part 1: Offering" - 8:40   
 "Suite For Martin Luther King Part 2: Mode For Martin" - 7:59   
 "Kharma" - 5:04

Personnel 
Charles Earland - organ, electric piano, synthesizer
Jon Faddis - trumpet
Clifford Adams - trombone
Dave Hubbard - soprano saxophone, tenor saxophone, flute
Aurell Ray - guitar
Ron Carter - electric bass 
George Johnson - drums

References 

Charles Earland live albums
1974 live albums
Prestige Records live albums
Albums recorded at the Montreux Jazz Festival